The 85th Delaware General Assembly was a meeting of the legislative branch of the state government, consisting of the Delaware Senate and the Delaware House of Representatives. Elections were held the first Tuesday after November 1st and terms began in Dover on the first Tuesday in January. This date was January 1, 1889, which was two weeks before the beginning of the third administrative year of Governor Benjamin T. Biggs. 

Currently the distribution of the Senate Assembly seats was made to three senators for each of the three counties.  Likewise the current distribution of the House Assembly seats was made to seven representatives for each of the three counties.  The actual population changes of the county did not directly affect the number of senators or representatives at this time. 

In the 85th Delaware General Assembly session the Senate had a  Democratic majority and the House had a Republican majority.

Leadership

Senate
 Beniah L. Lewis, Kent County,  Democratic

House of Representatives
 John H. Hoffecker, Kent County, Republican

Members

Senate
Senators were normally elected by the public for a four-year term; although many were selected to fill the remainder of a vacant position.

House of Representative
Representatives were elected by the public for a two-year term.

References

Places with more information
Delaware Historical Society; website; 505 North Market Street, Wilmington, Delaware 19801; (302) 655-7161
University of Delaware; Library website; 181 South College Avenue, Newark, Delaware 19717; (302) 831-2965

8 085
1889 in Delaware
1890 in Delaware
1891 in Delaware